M'semen, msemmen ( msamman, musamman) or rghaif, is a traditional flatbread originally from the Maghreb, commonly found in Algeria, Morocco, and Tunisia. It is usually served with honey or a cup of aromatic morning mint tea or coffee. M'semen can also be stuffed with meat (khlea) or onion and tomatoes.

Varieties and similar foods 
There is a variety that is made from pulling the dough into strands and forming a disk that is also called malwi in Northwest Africa. It is also similar to the Somali sabaayah. or the Indian paratha

Recipe 

M'semen dough is made of flour, durum wheat semolina, dry yeast, melted butter, salt, sugar and a bit of water. The dough is cut into several balls, which are then rolled out on an oiled surface and folded into square pancakes with multiple internal layers. Semolina is sprinkled on the layers to prevent sticking and to allow for the heat to  separate the layers when cooked on a griddle.

See also
 List of breads
 Berber cuisine

References 

Berber cuisine
Arab cuisine
Algerian cuisine
Moroccan cuisine
Tunisian cuisine
North African cuisine
Flatbreads
Maghrebi cuisine